Kinegan (also Romanized as Kīnegān) is a village in Sar Asiab-e Farsangi Rural District, in the Central District of Kerman County, Kerman Province, Iran. At the 2006 census, its population was 141, in 39 families.

References 

Populated places in Kerman County